The Vardebukta Formation is a geologic formation in Norway. It preserves fossils dating back to the Early Triassic (Dienerian) period.

See also 
 List of fossiliferous stratigraphic units in Norway

References

Further reading 
 M. A. Salamon, P. Gorzelak, N. M. Hanken, H. E. Riise, and B. Ferré. 2015. Crinoids from Svalbard in the aftermath of the end−Permian mass extinction. Polish Polar Research: The Journal of Committee on Polar Research of Polish Academy of Sciences 36(3):225-238

Geologic formations of Norway
Triassic System of Europe
Triassic Norway
Induan Stage
Olenekian Stage
Conglomerate formations
Sandstone formations
Mudstone formations
Geology of Svalbard